The 1960–61 season was Stoke City's 54th season in the Football League and the 21st in the Second Division.

With the unsuccessful Frank Taylor now departed new manager Tony Waddington quickly began to stamp his mark on the club allowing a number of players to leave the club whilst bringing in his own replacements. It was obviously going to be a transitional season for the club but there was probably too much upheaval as performances out on the pitch were not good and despite a 9–0 win over Plymouth Argyle, Stoke finished in 18th place avoiding relegation by three points.

Season review

League
A clear-out of players was under way in the summer of 1960 with two goalkeepers Bill Robertson and Wilf Hall both departing. Also leaving the Victoria Ground was long serving defender John McCue and a number of fringe players. To replace the hole left by the departure of the 'keepers Tony Waddington made his first signing, Irish international Jimmy O'Neill from Everton for £5,000.

There were no instant improvements as Stoke searched for a sustained run of success. An attack that could not score regularly 
was a major problem and it was so bad that by Christmas time centre back Bill Asprey was moved up front and he impressed scoring twice in a 9–0 win over Plymouth Argyle and got a hat trick against Charlton Athletic. That win over Plymouth is Stoke second highest league victory. Ahead of the March transfer deadline, Waddington paid £7,000 to Blackpool for their winger Jackie Mudie whose vast experience brought guile to the attack. Mudie effectively replaced Dennis Wilshaw who broke his leg in the FA Cup at Newcastle and had to retire.

Stoke took 18th place in the Second Division at the end of Waddingtons first season in charge their away form letting them down badly with just three wins recorded and 12 goals scored. And for the first time since the 1907–08 season the average home attendance was under 10,000 as Waddington realised that much work was required to turn around the fortunes of Stoke City.

FA Cup
In the FA Cup Stoke made it to the fifth round before losing to Newcastle United after beating West Ham United and a tricky three matches against Aldershot.

League Cup
The 1960–61 season was also the start of a new cup competition the Football League Cup, Stoke made an embarrassing start losing 3–1 to Fourth Division Doncaster Rovers. Stoke didn't even score as Rovers defender Tommy Hymers scored an own goal giving him the dubious honour of being Stoke's first League Cup goalscorer.

Final league table

Results

Stoke's score comes first

Legend

Football League Second Division

FA Cup

League Cup

Squad statistics

References

Stoke City F.C. seasons
Stoke